Ghazban (also Romanized as Ghaẕbān and Ghazbān; also known as ‘Ashīreh-ye Qazbān) is a village in Jahad Rural District, Hamidiyeh District, Ahvaz County, Khuzestan Province, Iran. At the 2006 census, its population was 218, in 40 families.

References 

Populated places in Ahvaz County